This is a list of alternative newspapers by country.

Canada

Alberta
Vue Weekly, Edmonton. Final issue published November, 2018. Now online.

British Columbia
The Georgia Straight, Vancouver
Monday Magazine, Victoria

Manitoba
Uptown, Winnipeg

New Brunswick

Newfoundland and Labrador
The Scope, St. John's

Nova Scotia
The Coast, Halifax Regional Municipality
 The Grapevine, Annapolis Valley

Ontario
Now, Toronto
View Magazine, Hamilton

Quebec
Voir, chain headquartered in Quebec (French language)

Greece
Athens Voice, Athens

Iceland
The Reykjavík Grapevine, Reykjavík

Mexico 
Proceso, Mexico City
ZETA, Tijuana

Russia
The eXile, Moscow

Spain
BCN Mes, Barcelona (alt weekly format published monthly in paper, more frequently online)
 Diagonal Periódico, Madrid (biweekly)

United States

Alabama
Lagniappe, Mobile (weekly)

Alaska
Anchorage Press, Anchorage

Arizona

Phoenix New Times, Phoenix
Tucson Weekly, Tucson

Arkansas
Arkansas Times, Little Rock

California
Chico News & Review, Chico
Desert Star Weekly, Palm Springs
East Bay Express, Oakland
Easy Reader, Hermosa Beach
Good Times, Santa Cruz
LA Weekly, Los Angeles
Metro Silicon Valley, San Jose
Monterey County Weekly, Seaside
New Times (weekly), San Luis Obispo, owned by the New Times Media Group
North Bay Bohemian, Sonoma, Marin, and Napa Counties
North Coast Journal, Humboldt County
OC Weekly, Orange County
Pacific Sun, Marin County
Palo Alto Weekly, Palo Alto
Pasadena Weekly, Pasadena
Sacramento News & Review, Sacramento
San Diego CityBeat, San Diego
San Diego Reader, San Diego
San Francisco Bay Guardian, San Francisco
Santa Barbara Independent, Santa Barbara
Santa Maria Sun, Santa Maria, owned by the New Times Media Group
SF Weekly, San Francisco
Ventura County Reporter, Ventura County

Colorado
Boulder Weekly, Boulder
Colorado Springs Independent, Colorado Springs
Westword, Denver

Connecticut
Hartford Advocate, Hartford, 
New Haven Advocate, New Haven,

District of Columbia
Washington City Paper, Washington,

Florida

Creative Loafing Tampa, Tampa, 
Folio Weekly, Jacksonville, 
Miami New Times, Miami, owned by the New Times Media chain, 
New Times Broward-Palm Beach, Ft. Lauderdale, owned by the New Times Media chain, 
Orlando Weekly, Orlando,

Georgia
The 11th Hour, Macon (biweekly), 
Connect Savannah, Savannah, 
Creative Loafing Atlanta, Atlanta, 
Flagpole Magazine, Athens, 
Metro Spirit, Augusta,

Hawaii
Maui Time Weekly, Maui,

Idaho
Boise Weekly, Boise,

Illinois
Chicago Reader, Chicago, 
Illinois Times, Springfield, 
Newcity, Chicago, 
The Rock River Times, Rockford,

Indiana
Nuvo Newsweekly, Indianapolis,

Iowa
Cityview, Des Moines,
Juice, Des Moines, 
River Cities' Reader, Davenport,

Kansas
The Pitch, Kansas City, (monthly)

Kentucky

Louisville Eccentric Observer, Louisville,

Louisiana

Gambit, New Orleans,

Maine
The Maine Edge, Bangor, 
Portland Phoenix, Portland,

Maryland
Baltimore City Paper, Baltimore,

Massachusetts

DigBoston, Boston
The Real Paper, Cambridge, 1972–1981 
Valley Advocate, Northampton 
Worcester Magazine, Worcester

Michigan
City Pulse, Lansing, 
Metro Times, Detroit, 
Northern Express, Traverse City, 
Real Detroit Weekly, Detroit,

Minnesota
City Pages, Minneapolis and St. Paul

Mississippi
The Jackson Free Press, Jackson,

Missouri

The Pitch, Kansas City, (monthly), 
The Riverfront Times, St. Louis,

Montana

Missoula Independent, Missoula,

Nevada
Las Vegas CityLife, Las Vegas, 
Las Vegas Weekly, Las Vegas, 
Reno News & Review, Reno

New Hampshire
The Hippo, Manchester, Nashua and Concord, 
The New Hampshire Gazette, Portsmouth,

New Jersey
The Aquarian Weekly, North Jersey, 
Atlantic City Weekly, Atlantic City, 
TAPinto, formerly The Alternative Press, hyperlocal digital news,

New Mexico

Santa Fe Reporter, Santa Fe, 
Weekly Alibi, Albuquerque,

New York

Artvoice, Buffalo, 
The Beast, Buffalo, 
City Newspaper, Rochester,
Long Island Press, Long Island, 
Metroland, Albany, 
Syracuse New Times, Syracuse, 
TAPinto, hyperlocal digital news in Putnam County,
Village Voice

North Carolina
Creative Loafing Charlotte, Charlotte, 1972–present
Indy Week, Durham, 1983–present
Mountain Xpress, Asheville, 1994–present
Yes! Weekly, Greensboro, 2005–present
Triad City Beat, Greensboro, 2014–present

North Dakota
High Plains Reader, Fargo,

Ohio
Active Dayton, Dayton,
Cincinnati CityBeat, Cincinnati, 
Cleveland Scene, Cleveland, 
Columbus Alive, Columbus, 
Dayton City Paper, Dayton, 
The Other Paper, Columbus,
Toledo City Paper, Toledo, 
Toledo Free Press, Toledo,

Oklahoma
Oklahoma Gazette, Oklahoma City metropolitan area,

Oregon

Eugene Weekly, Eugene, 
The Portland Mercury, Portland, 
Salem Weekly, Salem, 
Willamette Week, Portland,

Pennsylvania

Erie Reader, Erie, 
Philadelphia City Paper, Philadelphia,
Philadelphia Weekly, Philadelphia,
Pittsburgh City Paper, Pittsburgh, 
The Weekender, Wilkes-Barre, 
The Weekly Recorder, Washington,

Rhode Island
Mothers News, Providence, 2010–present
Providence Phoenix, Providence, 1968-2014
The College Hill Independent, Providence, 1990–present

South Carolina
Charleston City Paper, Charleston, 
Columbia City Paper, Columbia, 
Free Times, Columbia,

Tennessee

Memphis Flyer, Memphis, 
Murfreesboro Pulse, Murfreesboro, 
Nashville Scene, Nashville,

Texas
The Austin Chronicle, Austin
Dallas Observer, Dallas
Fort Worth Weekly, Fort Worth
Houstonia, Houston
San Antonio Current, San Antonio
The Texas Observer, Austin (monthly)
What's Up, El Paso

Utah
Salt Lake City Weekly, Salt Lake City,

Vermont

Seven Days, Burlington,

Virginia
C-Ville Weekly, Charlottesville,
Style Weekly, Richmond,

Washington
Cascadia Weekly, Bellingham
The Comet, Wenatchee
The Inlander, Spokane, 
Seattle Weekly, Seattle,
The Stranger, Seattle, 
Tacoma Weekly, Tacoma, 
Weekly Volcano, Tacoma and Olympia,

West Virginia

Wisconsin

Isthmus, Madison, 
The Second Supper, La Crosse, 
Shepherd Express, Milwaukee

Wyoming

Defunct alternative weeklies
Amsterdam Weekly, Amsterdam, Netherlands, 
 Bugle, Milwaukee, Wisconsin (1970–1978)
Cleveland Free Times, Cleveland, Ohio (merged with Cleveland Scene)
Echo Weekly, Waterloo Region, Canada (1997–2011)
FFWD, Calgary, (ended March 5, 2015)
Free Press Houston, Houston, Texas (2003-2018)
The Great Speckled Bird, Atlanta, Georgia
Helix, Seattle, Washington (1967–1970)Honolulu Weekly, Honolulu, Hawaii (ended June 2013)Hour Community, Montreal (ended May 2012)Hundred Flowers, Minneapolis, Minnesota (1970–1972)Ici Montréal, Montreal (ended April 2009)Knoxville Voice, Knoxville, TennesseeLA CityBeat, Los Angeles, CaliforniaLas Vegas Mercury, Las Vegas, Nevada (ended March 2005)Lehigh Valley Exposed, Easton, PennsylvaniaLos Angeles Reader, Los Angeles, CaliforniaMissoula Independent, Missoula, Montana, (1991-2018)Montreal Mirror, Montreal (ended June 2012)New Hampshire Free Press, Keene, New HampshireNew Times LA, Los Angeles, CaliforniaThe Noise, Flagstaff, Arizona (1993-2017)North Carolina Anvil, Durham, North CarolinaOttawa XPress, Ottawa (ended May 2012)Philadelphia City Paper, PhiladelphiaPort Folio Weekly, Norfolk, VirginiaPulse Niagara, St. Catharines, OntarioSeattle Sun, Seattle, Washington (1974–1982)See Magazine, Edmonton (ended 2011)Urban Tulsa Weekly, Tulsa, Oklahoma and surrounding areas (1991–2013)The Vancouver Voice, Vancouver, Washington (ended 2011)The Valley Beat, Allentown, Pennsylvania (ended 2015)

Defunct alternative biweekly or monthly newspapersToronto Clarion'', 1976–1985, Ontario, Canada

References

External links
 Underground/Alternative Newspapers History and Geography Maps and databases showing over 2,000 underground/alternative newspapers between 1965 and 1975 in the U.S.

Alternative weekly newspapers